Maranatha Baptist University is a private Baptist university in Watertown, Wisconsin.

History
The institution was founded in 1968 as Maranatha Baptist Bible College by B. Myron Cedarholm. The college was named for the Aramaic phrase Maranatha, which means "Lo, He cometh" (I Corinthians 16:22). Dr. Cedarholm helped raise $150,000 to purchase the Watertown campus, now valued at $18 million, from the Brothers of the Holy Cross located in South Bend, Indiana. Maranatha Baptist Bible College opened just three months later, on September 10, 1968, with 173 students and 27 faculty members. Maranatha awarded degrees to the first graduating class, 13 students, on May 31, 1969. Since the college's beginning, more than 40 different building projects, including the Cedarholm Library, dormitories, a science lab and classroom building, and the Dining Complex, have been completed. The second decade of the 21st century saw Maranatha Online and Distance Learning and Maranatha Baptist Seminary solidly established. Through synchronous and online options, seminary and graduate studies programs, as well as undergraduate majors, are now offered to students around the world.

Today, the university has recorded more than 6,000 graduates since its founding, with graduates serving around the nation and around the world. Maranatha was chartered by the State of Wisconsin in 1968 and accredited by the Higher Learning Commission in 1993.

The current president is Dr. Marty Marriott, who began his duties during the Spring semester of 2010. Since 2021, Dr. Matthew Davis has functioned as the university's CEO.

On December 13, 2013, Marriott announced that Maranatha had changed its name to Maranatha Baptist University to reflect "what Maranatha is and has been for many years.”

Academics
Maranatha Baptist University offers nine associate degrees, twenty-nine bachelor's degrees, nine master's degrees and one doctorate. Maranatha Baptist Bible Institute and Maranatha Baptist Seminary, operated by the university and located on the Watertown campus, offer specialized degrees for those pursuing Christian ministry. The university has two colleges, three schools and a Seminary and Bible Institute:

 College of Bible and Church Ministries
 College of Arts and Sciences (Humanities, Music, Science)
 School of Business
 School of Education
 School of Nursing
 Maranatha Baptist Seminary
 Maranatha Baptist Bible Institute

Maranatha has 78.5% of classes with fewer than 20 students and has a 12:1 student-faculty ratio.

Accreditation and memberships
Maranatha has been regionally accredited by the Higher Learning Commission since 1993. The university remains in good standing with HLC. Education programs at MBU are recognized by the Wisconsin Department of Public Instruction for purposes of teacher certification. The Nursing Department is approved by the Wisconsin State Board of Nursing Department and accredited through the Commission on Collegiate Nursing Education (CCNE).

MBU maintains memberships in various organizations including the American Association of Collegiate Registrars and Admissions Officers, American Association of Christian Colleges and Seminaries, National Christian College Athletic Association- Division II, and the National Collegiate Athletic Association- Division III.

Rankings
For its 2022 rankings, U.S. News & World Report ranked Maranatha #25 in Regional Colleges Midwest and #3 in Top Performers on Social Mobility.

MBU's Nursing school is ranked #2 out of 20 in the State of Wisconsin.

Campus

Old Main

Construction of Old Main was started in 1873 and completed in four phases over the course of 21 years. Originally home to Sacred Heart College, the building was purchased from the Brothers of Holy Cross by B. Myron Cedarholm in 1968. It now houses three floors of classrooms, administrative offices, Maranatha Baptist Academy, the campus post office, and two fine arts performance halls. Old Main is also home to the campus coffeehouse Old Main Cafe which was established in 2007.

Dining complex

The  dining complex was completed in 2005, and serves nearly 1,500 meals every weekday. It seats almost 400 in a variety of seating arrangements. It also has eight classrooms, two computer labs, and wireless networking.

Cedarholm Library

Opened in 1996, the Cedarholm Library has resources for research and casual reading. A web-based OPAC (online public access catalog), computer-equipped workstations, a media center, and instructional material curriculum are some of the resources available.

Gymnasium
The gymnasium houses Maranatha's athletic facilities, including two gymnasiums, a weight room, fitness area, trainer and faculty offices, several locker room facilities, and the Alumni Hall of Fame. The main gymnasium also doubles as an auditorium, which is used for chapel services, special meetings, drama performances, and music concerts.

Hanneman Hall
Named after the late Robert Hanneman, Jr., a potato geneticist at the University of Wisconsin and friend of the college, Hanneman Hall houses Maranatha's nursing program and science department.

Dormitories
Maranatha has five men's and five women's dormitories; Spurgeon, Judson, Leland, Armitage, and Carey are the men's halls, while Day, Weeks, Melford, Hilsen, and Gould are the women's halls.

Student life
Students can participate in a variety of campus activities, including intramural sports, blood drives, special lectures, Fine arts, music and drama, student service societies, and intercollegiate athletics. Chapel services are also a part of life at Maranatha. Maranatha requires its students to follow a code of personal conduct based on New Testament Biblical principles. Those who violate Maranatha's student life policies are subject to disciplinary action.

All undergraduate students are required to live on campus until age 23, unless living with parents and commuting to classes. Dorm leadership consists of "room leaders," "resident assistants," and "dorm supervisors."

Students may also be elected to student body offices, where they participate in planning campus events and leading special student meetings and programs. Additional leadership opportunities exist in numerous resident student organizations on campus.

Extra-curricular activities

College clubs 
College Conservatives
Men and Women's Student Societies that are involved in intramural sports and service opportunities

Men's societies 
 Conquerors
 Golden Eagles
 Hurricanes
 Phantoms
 Raptors

Women's societies 
 Arctic Wolves
 Pumas
 Diamondbacks
 Thunder
 Titans

ROTC
Maranatha's army ROTC detachment, Charlie Company of Badger Battalion, established in 2006, partnered with the University of Wisconsin to produce 65 United States Army Officers for the Active, Reserve, and National Guard components. The 2021–2022 academic year was the last year of operation for Charlie Company due to Army ROTC downsizing that closed a number of small programs. Charlie Company won the five-man category of the Badger Ranger Challenge competition on numerous occasions. MBU still partners with nearby colleges and universities to offer an Air Force ROTC program.

Athletics
Maranatha Baptist athletic teams called are the Sabercats. Since 1999, the university has been a member of the Division III level of the National Collegiate Athletic Association (NCAA), primarily competing as an NCAA D-III Independent since the 2013–14 academic year. They were also a member of the National Christian College Athletic Association (NCCAA), primarily competing as an independent in the North Region of the Division II level. The Sabercats previously competed as a charter member of the Northern Athletics Conference (NAC; now known as the Northern Athletics Collegiate Conference (NACC) since the 2013–14 school year) from 2006–07 to 2012–13.

Maranatha Baptist competes in ten intercollegiate varsity sports: Men's sports baseball, basketball, cross country, soccer and volleyball; while women's sports include basketball, cross country, soccer, softball and volleyball.

Nickname
The athletics teams were named the Crusaders, but in the fall of 2014, the name was changed to the Sabercats, while keeping the colors blue and gold.

Football
MBU's overall program record is 141-250-3. Over the course of 47 years of history, the football program won 6 conference Championships: 1975, 1976, 1990, 1996, 1998, and 2002. The team appeared in one bowl game in 1998. MBU was affiliated with the Upper Midwest Conference and the Northern Athletics Conference. As of February 2, 2017, Maranatha discontinued its football program.

Women's volleyball
Maranatha has a winning tradition in women's volleyball. The overall program record is 602-323 (.651)  The team has won 23 NCCAA Regional Championships and eight NCCAA National Championships (1987, 1989, 1990, 1991, 1992, 1994, 2015, 2016, 2017).

Men's basketball
MBU's men's basketball team has an overall program record of 537–748. The team has won six conference championships (Lake Michigan Conference, WCIC), 11 NCCAA regional championships and one NCCAA National Championship (1990).  The Sabercats compete in both the NCAA Division III and the NCCAA Division II.

Music groups
Symphonic Band: Typically a 50 to 60-member group under the direction of Dr. David Brown, which tours every fall, as well as performing several annual on-campus concerts (Christmas Chapel, Religious Liberty Day Chapel, Good Friday Chapel, Spring Concert). The group performs a balance of sacred literature and literature from standard band works.
Percussion Ensemble: A touring group that completes an annual Christmas tour under the direction of Mr. Andrew Bonnema.
Symphonic Orchestra: The MBU Orchestra, directed by Miss Melody Steinbart, performs several on-campus performances, in addition to accompanying choirs at the Fall Festival and triennial Messiah performance.
Choirs: MBU hosts three choirs; The Madrigal Choir (Dr. David Brown, director) and the Chamber Singers (Dr. David Ledgerwood, director) - both of which perform extensively on campus and tour every spring; and the MBU Chorale (Mr. Peter Wright, director), a campus-based group that performs in local churches as well as in chapels and with the other choirs at the triennial Messiah performance.
Touring Groups: MBU also employees two summer tour groups that sing in local churches across the country. These groups, called Heritage Singers and Praisemen, are composed of students from the university who promote the school while singing on tour. While Heritage Singers is a mixed group of normally 6-8 people who sing and play instruments, Praisemen includes generally four male singers and a pianist.

Presidents
B. Myron Cedarholm (1968–1983)
Arno Q. Weniger, Jr. (1983–1998)
David Jaspers (1998–2006)
Charles Phelps (2007–2009)
S. Martin Marriott (2009–present)

Notable alumni
Tom Allen - Head coach, Indiana University football
Daniel Davis - Former Republican member of the Florida House of Representatives
Jim Gruenwald - American Greco-Roman wrestler
Nate Oats - University of Alabama men's head basketball coach
Benjamin Lee Peterson - Olympic gold medalist in freestyle wrestling at the 1972 Summer Olympics and silver medalist at the 1976 Summer Olympics
Wira Wama - Former professional soccer player for Hekari United

References

External links
 Official website
 Official athletics website

Baptist Christianity in Wisconsin
Baptist universities and colleges in the United States
Bible colleges
Educational institutions established in 1968
Education in Jefferson County, Wisconsin
Private universities and colleges in Wisconsin
Buildings and structures in Jefferson County, Wisconsin
NCAA Division III independents